Corydalis elegans is a species of plant in the family Papaveraceae. It is found in India, China and the West Himalayas.

References

elegans
Plants described in 1855
Taxa named by Thomas Thomson (botanist)
Taxa named by Joseph Dalton Hooker